Ptochoryctis alma is a moth in the family Autostichidae. It was described by Edward Meyrick in 1908. It is found southern India.

The wingspan is about 24 mm. The forewings are light yellow ochreous and the hindwings are light ochreous yellowish.

References

Moths described in 1908
Ptochoryctis